Zheng Yin or Yin Zheng may refer to:

Surnamed Zheng
 Zheng Yin (Early Tang) (d. 710), chancellor of the Tang dynasty
 Zheng Yin (Middle Tang) (752–829), chancellor of the Tang dynasty
 Yin Zheng (pianist), Chinese pianist

Surnamed Yin
 Yin Zheng (actor) (born 1986), Chinese actor

See also
Qin Shi Huang, or Ying Zheng
Yongzheng Emperor, or Yin Zhen